Johann Rosenmüller (1619 – 10 September 1684) was a German Baroque composer, who played a part in transmitting Italian musical styles to the north.

Career
Rosenmüller was born in Oelsnitz, near Plauen in Saxony.  He studied at the University of Leipzig, graduating in 1640. He served as organist of the Nikolaikirche Leipzig from 1651, and had been assured of advancement to cantor. He became director of music in absentia to the Altenburg court in 1654. However, in 1655 he was accused of homosexual activities with choirboys.

To avoid prison he fled to Italy, and by 1658 was employed at Saint Mark's in Venice. He composed many vocal works while teaching at an orphanage for girls (Ospedale della Pietà), between 1678 and 1682.  The works of Giovanni Legrenzi were among his Italian influences and his sacred compositions show the influence of Heinrich Schütz.

In his last years, Rosenmüller returned to Germany with Duke Anton-Ulrich of Brunswick-Wolfenbüttel, at whose court he served as choir master. He died in Wolfenbüttel on 10 September 1684, and is buried there.

Selected works
Kern-Sprüche mehrentheils aus heiliger Schrifft Altes und Neues Testaments (Core sentences, mostly from holy scriptures Old and New Testament), Leipzig (1648)

Aeterne Deus, clementissime Pater, 1v, 2 str, bc 
Christum lieb haben, 3vv, 2 str, bc
Coeli enarrant gloriam Dei, 3vv, 2 str, bc
Danket dem Herren und prediget, 2vv, 2 str, bc 
Danksaget dem Vater, 5vv, 2 str, bc
Daran ist erschienen die Liebe Gottes, 5vv, 2 str, bc
Das ist das ewige Leben, 3vv, bc
Das ist ein köstlich Ding, 2vv, 5 str, bc
Die Augen des Herren, 4vv, 2 str, bc
Ein Tag in deinen Vorhöfen, 3vv, 2 str, bc
Habe deine Lust an dem Herren, 1v, 5 str, bc
Hebet eure Augen auf gen Himmel, 2vv, 2 str, bc 
In te Domine speravi, 4vv, 2 str, bc
Lieber Herr Gott, 1v, 3 str/brass, bc
Mater Jerusalem, civitas sancta Dei, 2vv, 2 str, bc
Meine Seele harret nur auf Gott, 3vv, 2 str, bc
O admirabile commercium, 2vv, 4 str/brass, bc
O Domine Jesu Christe, adoro te, 3vv, bc
O nomen Jesu, nomen dulce, 4vv, bc
Treiffet ihr Himmel von oben, 1v, 2 str, bc

Andere Kern-Sprüche (Other core sentences), Leipzig (1652–1653)

 Also hat Gott die Welt geliebet, 5vv, 5 str/brass, bc; 
 Amo te Deus meus amore magno, 2vv, 4 str/brass, bc; 
 Christum ducem, qui per crucem, 1v, 2 str, bc; 
 Das ist meine Freude, 1v, 2 str, bc; 
 Der Name des Herren, 5vv, 2 str, bc; 
 Die Gnade unseres Herren Jesu Christi, 4vv, bc; 
 Domine Deus meus, 2vv, 2 str, bc; 
 Herr mein Gott, ich danke dir, 3vv, 2 str, bc; 
 Herr, wenn ich nur dich habe, 1v, 5 str, bc; 
 Ich bin das Brod des Lebens, 3vv, 2 str, bc; 
 Ich hielte mich nicht dafür, 4vv, bc; 
 Ist Gott für uns, 1v, 5 str, bc; 
 Kündlich gross ist das gottselige Geheimnis, 3vv, bc; 
 O dives omnium bonarum dapum, 1v, 3 str/brass, bc; 
 O dulcis Christe, bone Jesu charitas, 2vv, 3 str/brass, bc; 
 Siehe an die Wercke Gottes, 5vv, 5 str/brass, bc; 
 Siehe des Herren Auge, 3vv, 2 str, bc; 
 Vulnera Jesu Christi, 1v, 2 str, bc; 
 Wahrlich, wahrlich ich sage euch, 4vv, 2 str, bc; 
 Weil wir wissen, dass der Mensch, 3vv, 2 str, bc

Selected recordings
 Sinfonias No. 1, 2, 4 Jordi Savall Astree 
 Vespers (2CD) Cantus Cölln Konrad Junghänel 1996 HMC
 Weihnachtshistorie Cantus Cölln Junghänel HMC
 Sacri Concerti Cantus Cölln Junghänel 1994 DHM
 Deutsche Geistliche Konzerte:  Siehe an die Werke Gottes. Entsetze dich Natur. Arno Paduch 2000 Christophorus Records
 Instrumental & Vocal works. The King's Noyse. HMU
 Requiem (2CD) Musica Fiata Roland Wilson. Sony
 Lamentations. Ingrid Schmidthüsen Parnassi Musici CPO 1999
 Lamentations. Klaus Wünderlich (SWR)(SWR recordings 1956–58)
 Dixit Dominus; Lauda Sion; Nisi Dominus; Magnificat. La Soranza, Trinity Baroque, Wiesbadener Knabenchor, Arno Paduch Amati 1996
 Jube Domine; In te Domine speravi; Qui habitat in adjutorio; Ecce nunc benedicite; Exurge gloria mea; Nunc dimittis; Salve regina. Paduch Christophorus 2009
 Beatus Vir; Jubilate Deo; Misericordias Domini; Coelestes Spiritus; Nisi Dominus;Salve mi Jesu Sonatas Raquel Andueza, Wolf Matthias Friedrich, Gli Incogniti, Amandine Beyer. Zig-Zag
 Lo Zuane Tedeso Estote fortes in bello; Surgamus ad laudes; O dives omnium bonarum; Ego te laudo; In te Domine speravi; Laudate pueri Dominum; Salve Regina I fedeli PAN
 Vox Dilecti Mei O Salvator dilectissime; Christum ducem qui per crucem; In te Domine speravi; O dives omnium bonarum; Vox dilecti mei; O anima mea suspira ardenter Sonatas Alex Potter, Chelycus Ensemble  Ramee

References

External links

Biography and works
Johann Rosenmüller Ensemble

Digitalized copy of the first edition of Kern-Sprüche, from the Saxon State and University Library Dresden

1619 births
1684 deaths
Italian Baroque composers
German classical composers
17th-century LGBT people
German LGBT musicians
People prosecuted under anti-homosexuality laws
Venetian School (music) composers
LGBT classical composers
17th-century Italian composers
German expatriates in Italy
German male classical composers
17th-century male musicians